The 2006–07 SK Rapid Wien season is the 109th season in club history.

Squad statistics

Goal scorers

Fixtures and results

Bundesliga

League table

Cup

References

2006-07 Rapid Wien Season
Austrian football clubs 2006–07 season